Denise Kramer-Scholer (born 9 September 1910, date of death unknown) was a Swiss fencer. She competed in the women's individual foil event at the 1936 Summer Olympics.

References

External links
 

1910 births
Year of death missing
Swiss female foil fencers
Olympic fencers of Switzerland
Fencers at the 1936 Summer Olympics